Mehmet Zeki Çelik (born 17 February 1997) is a Turkish professional footballer who plays as a right-back for Serie A club Roma and the Turkey national team.

Club career

Bursaspor
Born in Bursa as the youngest of nine children, Çelik went through the Bursaspor youth academy and became a professional in 2015. He signed on loan with Karacabey Birlikspor in 2015.

İstanbulspor
In 2016, he joined İstanbulspor. His good performance with İstanbulspor earned him a call-up to the senior Turkey national team in 2018, despite playing in the TFF First League.

Lille
On 8 July 2018, Çelik signed with Lille in France on a five-year contract. Çelik made his professional debut in a 3–1 Ligue 1 win over Stade Rennes on 11 August 2018.

Roma
On 5 July 2022, Çelik’s transfer to Roma from Lille was made official by the Serie A club, Roma. He has signed a four-year contract with the Giallorossi that runs until 30 June 2026.

International career
Çelik made his professional debut for the Turkey national football team in a 1–1 friendly with Russia national football team on 5 June 2018.

Career statistics

International

International goals
Scores and results list Turkey's goal tally first.

Honours
Lille
Ligue 1: 2020–21

References

External links

 Profile at the A.S. Roma website
 
 
 

1997 births
Living people
People from Yıldırım
Association football fullbacks
Turkish footballers
Turkey international footballers
Turkey youth international footballers
Bursaspor footballers
İstanbulspor footballers
TFF First League players
TFF Second League players
Lille OSC players
Ligue 1 players
A.S. Roma players
Serie A players
Turkish expatriate footballers
Turkish expatriate sportspeople in France
Expatriate footballers in France
Turkish expatriate sportspeople in Italy
Expatriate footballers in Italy
UEFA Euro 2020 players